Benjamin Baumgartner (born 22 April 2000) is an Austrian professional ice hockey forward for SC Bern of the National League (NL). He had played in the HC Davos system, and was on their senior team from 2018 to 2021. He was drafted 161st overall by the New Jersey Devils in the 2020 NHL Entry Draft. Internationally Baumgartner has played for the Austrian national team multiple times at the junior level, and made his senior debut at the 2019 World Championship.

Playing career
Baumgartner played at the under-17 level with ZSC Lions before moving to HC Davos junior development squad at the age of 14 in 2014. He made his professional debut as an 18-year old in the 2018–19 season with Davos, appearing in 20 games for 1 goal and 4 points. On 11 March 2019, Baumgartner was signed to his first full professional contract in agreeing to a three-year contract extension to continue with HC Davos. As he came up through the HC Davos system, Baumgartner had a Swiss-player license in the NL.

Baumgartner played with HC Davos during the 2019–20 season as he recorded 27 points in 37 regular season games. He missed a few games while playing with Austria U20 national team at the 2020 World Junior Championships.

At the 2020 NHL Entry Draft he was selected 161st overall by the New Jersey Devils. Baumgartner had been eligible for the previous two drafts but had not been selected.

International play
Baumgartner as the youngest member of the squad, represented Austria at the 2019 IIHF World Championship. He played four games and did not record a point.

Career statistics

Regular season and playoffs

International

References

External links
 

2000 births
Living people
Austrian expatriate ice hockey people
Austrian expatriate sportspeople in Switzerland
Austrian ice hockey forwards
SC Bern players
HC Davos players
HCB Ticino Rockets players
Ice hockey players at the 2016 Winter Youth Olympics
Lausanne HC players
New Jersey Devils draft picks
People from Zell am See
Sportspeople from Salzburg (state)
Expatriate ice hockey players in Switzerland